The Lawful Cheater, sometimes referred to as Lawful Cheaters, is a 1925 American silent crime drama film written by Frank O'Connor and Adele Buffington. The film was directed by O'Connor for B.P. Schulberg Productions, and starred Clara Bow, David Kirby, and Raymond McKee. After its 1925 U.S. theatrical release, the film was banned by the British Board of Film Censors.

The film is presumed to be a lost film.

Plot
Molly Burns (Clara Bow) is a young woman whose indiscreet behavior causes her to be caught and jailed in a police "round up" of suspicious characters. Her prison experience causes her to reflect upon and reform her own life. She convinces jail authorities that her two brothers and her boyfriend could be dissuaded from a life of crime. After her early release, she attempts to reform her indiscreet friends.

Cast

Reception
In American Film Cycles: the Silent Era, the film is called an "offbeat crime drama". In noting the film was a "cheaply produced melodrama" with a storyline that was "slight and trite", Hal Erickson of AllRovi wrote that beyond the film benefitting from actual use of New York City locations, Clara Bow acted as the film's "sole redeeming factor." He noted that at one point in the film, Bow's character of Molly Burns appeared in male drag which even if "far from convincing", was "fun to watch."

See also
List of lost films

References

External links

1925 films
American crime drama films
1925 crime drama films
American black-and-white films
American silent feature films
Lost American films
Films produced by B. P. Schulberg
1925 lost films
Lost crime drama films
Preferred Pictures films
Films directed by Frank O'Connor
1920s American films
Silent American drama films
1920s English-language films
English-language crime drama films